Péron's snake-eyed skink or callose-palmed shinning-skink (Cryptoblepharus plagiocephalus) is a species of lizard in the family Scincidae. It is endemic to Australia.

References

Cryptoblepharus
Skinks of Australia
Endemic fauna of Australia
Reptiles described in 1836
Taxa named by Jean Theodore Cocteau